The Great Divorce is a novel by the British author C. S. Lewis, published in 1945, based on a theological dream vision of his in which he reflects on the Christian conceptions of Heaven and Hell.

The working title was Who Goes Home? but the final name was changed at the publisher's insistence. The title refers to William Blake's poem The Marriage of Heaven and Hell. The Great Divorce was first printed as a serial in an Anglican newspaper called The Guardian in 1944 and 1945 and soon thereafter in book form.

Sources
Lewis's diverse sources for this work include the works of St. Augustine, Dante Aligheri, John Milton, John Bunyan, Emanuel Swedenborg and Lewis Carroll, as well as an American science fiction author whose name Lewis had forgotten but whom he mentions in his preface. George MacDonald, whom Lewis utilizes as a character in the story, Dante, Prudentius and Jeremy Taylor are alluded to in the text of chapter 9.

Plot summary
The narrator inexplicably finds himself in a grim and joyless city, the "grey town", where it rains continuously, even indoors, which is either Hell or Purgatory depending on whether or not one stays there. He eventually finds a bus stop for those who desire an excursion to some other place (the destination later turns out to be the foothills of Heaven). He waits in line for the bus and listens to the arguments between his fellow passengers. As they await the bus's arrival, many of them quit the line in disgust before the bus pulls up. When it arrives, the driver is an angel who shields his face from the passengers. Once the few remaining passengers have boarded, the bus flies upward, off the pavement into the grey, rainy sky.

The ascending bus breaks out of the rain clouds into a clear, pre-dawn sky, and as it rises its occupants' bodies change from being normal and solid into being transparent, faint, and vapor-like. When it reaches its destination the passengers on the bus – including the narrator – are gradually revealed to be ghosts. Although the country they disembark into is the most beautiful they have ever seen, every feature of the landscape, including streams of water and blades of grass, is unyieldingly solid compared to themselves: It causes them immense pain to walk on the grass, whose blades pierce their shadowy feet, and even a single leaf is far too heavy for any to lift.

Shining figures, men and women whom they have known on Earth, come to meet them and to urge them to repent and walk into Heaven proper. They promise as the ghosts travel onward and upward that they will become more solid and thus feel less and less discomfort. These figures, called "spirits" to distinguish them from the ghosts, offer to help them journey toward the mountains and the sunrise.

Almost all of the ghosts choose to return to the grey town instead, giving various reasons and excuses. Much of the interest of the book lies in the recognition it awakens of the plausibility and familiarity – and the thinness and self-deception – of the excuses that the ghosts refuse to abandon, even though to do so would bring them to "reality" and "joy forevermore". A former bishop refuses, having grown so used to framing his faith in abstract, pseudo-intellectual terms that he can no longer definitively say whether he believes in God; an artist refuses, arguing that he must preserve the reputation of his school of painting; a bitter cynic predicts that Heaven is a trick; a bully ("Big Man") is offended that people he believes beneath him are there; a nagging wife is angry that she will not be allowed to dominate her husband in Heaven. However one man corrupted on Earth by lust, which rides on his ghost in the form of an ugly lizard, permits an angel to kill the lizard and becomes a little more solid, and journeys forward, out of the narrative.

The narrator, a writer when alive, is met by the writer George MacDonald; the narrator hails MacDonald as his mentor, just as Dante did when first meeting Virgil in the Divine Comedy; and MacDonald becomes the narrator's guide in his journey, just as Virgil became Dante's. MacDonald explains that it is possible for a soul to choose to remain in Heaven despite having been in the grey town; for such souls, the goodness of Heaven will work backwards into their lives, turning even their worst sorrows into joy, and changing their experience on Earth to an extension of Heaven. Conversely, the evil of Hell works so that if a soul remains in, or returns to, the grey town, even any remembered happiness from life on Earth will lose its meaning, and the soul's experience on Earth would retrospectively become Hell.

Few of the ghosts realize that the grey town is, in fact, Hell. Indeed, it is not that much different from the life they led on Earth – joyless, friendless, and uncomfortable. It just goes on forever, and gets worse and worse, with some characters whispering their fear of the "night" that is eventually to come. According to MacDonald, while it is possible to leave Hell and enter Heaven, doing so requires turning away from the cherished evils that left them in hell (repentance); or as depicted by Lewis, embracing ultimate and unceasing joy itself. This is illustrated in an encounter of a blessed woman who had come to meet her husband: She is surrounded by gleaming attendants while he shrinks down to invisibility as he uses a collared tragedian – representative of his persistent use of the self-punishing emotional blackmail of others – to speak for him.

MacDonald has the narrator crouch down to look at a tiny crack in the soil they are standing on, and tells him that the bus came up through a crack no bigger than that, which contained the vast grey town, which is actually minuscule to the point of being invisible compared with the immensity of Heaven and reality.

In answer to the narrator's question, MacDonald confirms that when he writes about it “Of course you should tell them it is a dream!” Toward the end, the narrator expresses the terror and agony of remaining a ghost in the advent of full daybreak in Heaven, comparing the weight of the sunlight on a ghost as like having large blocks fall on one's body (at this point falling books awaken him).

The theme of the dream parallels The Pilgrim's Progress in which the protagonist dreams of judgment day in the House of the Interpreter. The use of chess imagery as well as the correspondence of dream elements to elements in the narrator's waking life is reminiscent of Alice's Adventures in Wonderland and Through the Looking-Glass. The book ends with the narrator awakening from his dream of Heaven into the unpleasant reality of wartime Britain, in conscious imitation of the "First Part" of The Pilgrim's Progress, the last sentence of which is: “So I awoke, and behold: It was a Dream.”

Stage adaptation
Philadelphia playwright and actor Anthony Lawton's original adaptation of The Great Divorce has been staged several times by Lantern Theater Company, including a weeklong run in February 2012. It also was adapted by Robert Smyth at Lamb's Players Theatre in San Diego, California, in 2004, and was included in their mainstage season for that year. Smyth originally adapted it for a C. S. Lewis conference in Oxford and Cambridge, England, before securing permission to include it in their season a year later.

In 2007 the Magis Theatre Company of New York City presented their adaptation in an off-Broadway run at Theatre 315 in the Theatre District with music by award-winning composer Elizabeth Swados and puppets by Ralph Lee. Lauded by the New York Times for its imagination, theatrical skill and daring, theatre critic Neil Genzlinger called the production thought provoking "with plenty to say to those interested in matters of the spirit."  In the following years Magis worked closely with the C. S. Lewis estate to make its adaptation available to over a dozen theatre companies from Canada to Ecuador. The Taproot Theatre of Seattle chose the Magis adaptation to open its new Theater Space in 2010 and extended the run due to popular demand.  The Pacific Theatre Company presented the Magis adaptation in its 2010–2011 season.

In late 2012, the Fellowship for the Performing Arts received permission from the C. S. Lewis estate to produce a stage version of The Great Divorce. The production premiered in Phoenix on December 14, 2013, toured throughout the United States from 2014 to 2016, opened briefly in 2020 and resumed in 2021.

Motion picture
It was announced that Mpower Pictures and Beloved Pictures are currently working on a film adaptation of The Great Divorce. Stephen McEveety was to lead the production team and author N. D. Wilson had been tapped to write the script. A 2013 release was originally planned. As of 2022 it has not been produced.

References

External links
 

1945 British novels
Bangsian fantasy
British fantasy novels
Novels by C. S. Lewis
1945 speculative fiction novels
Novels first published in serial form
Works originally published in The Guardian (Anglican newspaper)
Heaven and hell novels
Novels about dreams
Geoffrey Bles books